The 1912 Cincinnati football team was an American football team that represented the University of Cincinnati as a member of the Ohio Athletic Conference during the 1912 college football season. In their first season under head coach Lowell Dana, the team compiled a 3–4–1 record. Robert Heuck was the team captain. The team played its home games at Carson Field in Cincinnati.

Schedule

References

Cincinnati
Cincinnati Bearcats football seasons
Cincinnati football